The Round Lake Historic District (also known as Round Lake Residential Neighborhood) is a U.S. historic district (designated as such on September 29, 2003) located in St. Petersburg, Florida. The district is roughly bounded by 5th Avenue N, 9th Street N, 13th Avenue N, and 4th Street N. It contains 1000 historic buildings. Recently, it merged with several other neighborhoods - including S. Crescent and Uptown to become the Historic Uptown Neighborhood.

References

External links
 Pinellas County listings at National Register of Historic Places
 StPete.org - Urban Design & Historic Preservation Division - National Register Districts
 Historic Round Lake

National Register of Historic Places in Pinellas County, Florida
Geography of St. Petersburg, Florida
Historic districts on the National Register of Historic Places in Florida